Santiago Ruiz Rojas (born 12 January 1997) is a Colombian professional footballer who plays as a center back for Categoría Primera A club Envigado F.C.

External links
 
 

1997 births
Living people
Colombian footballers
Envigado F.C. players
Association football defenders
Categoría Primera A players
Footballers from Medellín